"Give It to You" is a song recorded by American singer-songwriter Martha Wash and the second release from her self-titled debut album, Martha Wash (1992). The song is the follow-up single to "Carry On", and is written and produced by Brian Alexander Morgan. It would be her second number-one single on Billboards Dance Club Songs chart, reaching the top spot on April 3, 1993. It also became a modest crossover hit on the Billboard Hot 100, peaking at number 90 in 1993.

Critical reception
Larry Flick from Billboard wrote, "Second shot from Wash's self-titled solo debut has more of a Black Box vibe than her recent No. 1 hit, "Carry On". The hook is simply irresistible, while the bass line firmly supports shoulder-shaking backup vocals and a plethora of cool keyboard effects. As always, Wash's one-of-a-kind soprano is the shining light of this track." Randy Clark from Cashbox described it as "a rather simple, cliched melody with its repetitious, discotheque beat". In his weekly UK chart commentary, James Masterton deemed it "a fairly standard piece of jack swing soul". Ralph Tee from Music Weeks RM Dance Update commented, "Martha opens her lungs and belts out the song with vitality and excitement, reflecting the urgency and uplifting quality of the music. An exceptional house track." 

Music video
A music video was produced to promote the single, directed by German director Marcus Nispel. It features Wash performing in a castle, surrounded by shirtless male dancers.

Impact and legacy
In 1996, British DJ duo Sharp Boyz picked the song as one of their favourites. George Mitchell said, "When I first heard this I had to buy two copies, it's a classic diva track. You need two copies so you can play them back to back." Steven React added, "She's one of the best vocalists in the world."

Track listings
 CD maxi (US)"Give It to You" (Top 40 Version by Dennis Ferrante and Kenny Ortiz) — 3:06  
"Give It to You" (Maurice's Mix) — 3:53  
"Give It to You" (Morales' Mix) — 3:49  
"Give It to You" (LP Version) — 3:49

 2x12" single (US)'
"Give It to You" (Momo's Klub Mix) — 6:44
"Give It to You" (Dead Zone Mix) — 5:42
"Give It to You" (Maurice's Klub Mix) — 6:48
"Give It to You" (Kaoz Klub Mix) — 6:24
"Give It to You" (Def Dub Mix) — 6:25
"Give It to You" (Momo's Dub Mix) — 7:34
"Give It to You" (Maurice's Underground Playground) — 7:25
"Give It to You" (Kaoz Dub It To You Mix) — 6:35
"Give It to You" (Top 40 Version) — 3:06

Charts

Weekly charts

Year-end charts

References

External links
Official video at YouTube

1993 singles
1993 songs
Martha Wash songs
RCA Records singles
Songs written by Brian Alexander Morgan
Music videos directed by Marcus Nispel